Antheraea exspectata is a moth of the family Saturniidae found in Sulawesi.

External links
Image

Antheraea
Moths of Indonesia
Moths described in 2000